Groove Theory is an American duo, with former member, singer-songwriter Amel Larrieux and songwriter/producer/actor, Bryce Wilson. The group is best known for their 1995 hit "Tell Me", which reached the top five of Billboards Hot 100 and the US Billboard R&B chart.

Early years
The group formed in New York City in 1993, when Amel Larrieux met Bryce Wilson while she was working at Rondor Music as a receptionist. Larrieux had been working at the music publishing company since the age of 18. A publisher at the company had signed Wilson as a producer, and knew he was interested in forming a group. He approached Larrieux, who he knew was a singer-songwriter, with one of Wilson's production tracks, saying "look, you wanna try writing a song? You know I can give you one of the tracks, and you can do it, and if you don't mind, you can demo it." Wilson hoped to use the group as a chance to utilize his production talents, while Larrieux wanted a chance to shine in R&B. Wilson also found it useful for Larrieux to both write, sing, and arrange each song instead of shopping around for different singers and songwriters.

Career

Commercial success
The group signed a recording contract with Epic Records, and in 1995, they released their self-titled debut album Groove Theory. The album featured the gold-selling hit single, "Tell Me", which reached number five on the Billboard Hot 100 and number three on the Hot R&B/Hip-Hop Songs. "Tell Me" peaked at No. 31 in the UK Singles Chart in November 1995. Other charted singles included "Baby Luv" and "Keep Trying", which reached numbers 18 and 36 on the R&B chart, respectively. The album also went on to be certified gold.

Break up
Larrieux left Groove Theory in 1999 to pursue a solo career, being replaced by Makeda Davis. The group signed with Columbia Records and recorded a new album, 'The Answer', which was expected for release in 2000. Displeased with Columbia's track record at the time with urban projects, Wilson asked for a release from the label, causing the album to remain unreleased. A single entitled "4 Shure" was released from the album to minor chart performance.

Larrieux began her solo career in her absence from the group, forming her own independent record label, Blisslife, to distribute her music. Wilson appeared in the films Beauty Shop, Trois and Hair Show, and produced music for Beyoncé, Amerie and Mary J. Blige.

Discography

Albums

Singles

References

External links

American contemporary R&B musical groups
American musical duos
Contemporary R&B duos
Columbia Records artists
Musical groups disestablished in 2001
Musical groups established in 1995
Musical groups reestablished in 2010
Musical groups from New York City
Male–female musical duos